Gisela Pulido Borrell (born 14 January 1994) is a Spanish kitesurfer. In 2004, she became the sport's youngest world champion, at age 10. She has subsequently won multiple world titles.

Biography
Gisela Pulido was born in Premià de Mar on 14 January 1994.

She was proclaimed Kitesurfing World Champion for the first time in November 2004, when she was only 10 years old. After this sporting success, she was awarded a Guinness World Record as the youngest kitesurfing world champion in history.

A year later, in October 2005, she won the gold medal in kitesurfing at Gravity Games H2O in Perth, Australia, and a month later, in November 2005, she retained her title as Kitesurfing World Champion in Nouméa, New Caledonia.

In November 2006, Gisela Pulido was proclaimed Kitesurfing World Champion for the third consecutive time at age 12.

In February 2007, she became the youngest ever nominee for a Laureus Award.

Pulido became world kitesurfing champion for the fourth time in a row by winning the event in Germany in August 2007.

In October 2008, she became World Champion for the fifth consecutive time after winning the Chilean event in Matanzas, the tenth round of the Professional Kiteboard Riders Association (PKRA) circuit.

In November 2010, she was proclaimed World Champion in Nouméa, in the penultimate round of the Championship (2010 was the first year with only one official Championship, according to the International Sailing Federation and the International Olympic Committee). In 2011, she repeated her world title victory in the German town of Sankt Peter-Ording, after defeating Polish competitor .

In 2017, Gisela Pulido was named Adoptive Daughter of the province of Cádiz.

Achievements

References

External links
  

1994 births
Female kitesurfers
Living people
People from Premià de Mar
Sportspeople from the Province of Barcelona
Sportswomen from Catalonia